The 120th Rajputana Infantry were an infantry regiment of the British Indian Army. The regiment traces their origins to 1817, when they were raised as the 2nd Battalion, 10th Regiment of Bombay Native Infantry.

The regiments first action was during the Anglo-Persian War in 1856, for which they were awarded the battle honours of Persia, Reshire, Bushire and Koosh-ah.  During World War I they were attached to the 6th (Poona) Division and served in the Mesopotamian campaign. They fought in the Battle of Basra, the Battle of Qurna, the Battle of Es Sinn before being delivered a setback at the Battle of Ctesiphon. Following this engagement, they withdrew to Kut. Trapped in the city during the Siege of Kut they were forced to surrender after 147 days. A second battalion was raised from men on leave and reinforcements and sent to Mesopotamia. 

After World War I the Indian government reformed the army moving from single battalion regiments to multi battalion regiments. In 1922, the 120th Rajputana Infantry became the 2nd (Prince of Wales's Own), 6th Rajputana Rifles. After independence they were one of the regiments allocated to the Indian Army.

Predecessor names
2nd Battalion, 10th Regiment of Bombay Native infantry - 1817
20th Bombay Native infantry - 1824
20th Bombay infantry - 1885
120th Rajputana Infantry - 1903

References

Sources

Moberly, F.J. (1923). Official History of the War: Mesopotamia Campaign, Imperial War Museum. 

British Indian Army infantry regiments
Bombay Presidency
Military units and formations established in 1817
Military units and formations disestablished in 1922